The 1979 World's Strongest Man was the third edition of World's Strongest Man and was won by Don Reinhoudt from the United States. It was his first title after finishing second the previous year. Lars Hedlund from Sweden finished second after finishing third the previous year, and Bill Kazmaier also from the United States finished third. The contest was held at the Universal Studios, California.

Final results

References

External links
 Official site

World's Strongest
World's Strongest Man
1979 in sports in California
1979 in American sports